Siegfried Joksch (4 July 1917 – 29 April 2006) was an Austrian international footballer. He played for Austria at the 1948 Summer Olympics.

References

1917 births
2006 deaths
Association football midfielders
Austrian footballers
Austria international footballers
Olympic footballers of Austria
Footballers at the 1948 Summer Olympics
FK Austria Wien players
FC Zürich players
Place of birth missing